Ritch Price is an American baseball coach and former player. He played college baseball at Linn–Benton Community College (1975–1976) and Willamette (1977–1978). He then served as the head baseball coach of the Menlo Oaks (1983–1986), the De Anza Dons (1987–1994), the Cal Poly Mustangs (1995–2002) and the Kansas Jayhawks (2003–2022).

Coaching career
Price took over as head coach at Cal Poly for the 1995 season, which was to be the Mustangs first at the Division I level.  In his second season, he led the team to a winning record.

He accepted the head coaching position at Kansas on July 2, 2002, and has led the Jayhawks to two NCAA Tournament berths and their first Big 12 Conference baseball tournament title in 2006.  Kansas had made only two NCAA appearances prior to Price's arrival. Price announced his retirement on May 22, 2022.

Head coaching record
The table below shows Ritch Price's record as a head coach at the Division I level.

Personal
Ritch Price graduated from Sweet Home High School in Sweet Home, Oregon before attending Willamette University.  He has three sons, all of whom have played for him at Kansas.  His eldest, Ritchie Price, was head coach at South Dakota State from 2008 to 2011, before returning to Kansas to again work on his father's staff.  Baseball America believes that the Prices were the first father–son duo to serve as head coach of two Division I programs at the same time.

References

Living people
Linn–Benton Roadrunners baseball players
Willamette Bearcats baseball players
High school baseball coaches in the United States
Menlo Oaks baseball coaches
De Anza Dons baseball coaches
Cal Poly Mustangs baseball coaches
Kansas Jayhawks baseball coaches
Year of birth missing (living people)
People from Linn County, Oregon